Hayesiana is a genus of moths in the family Sphingidae. It was described by David Stephen Fletcher in 1982.

Species
 Hayesiana farintaenia Zhu & Wang, 1997
 Hayesiana triopus (Westwood, 1847)

Macroglossini
Moth genera